Notagonum chathamense is a species of ground beetle in the subfamily Platyninae. It was described by Broun in 1909.

References

Notagonum
Beetles described in 1909